Cool James and Black Teacher (sometimes Cool James and the Black Teacher) were a Swedish Eurodance band consisting of Cool James and Black Teacher. The band was formed in Solna, Sweden and was signed to Stockholm Records.

Their first singles never became big hits, it was not until they released their album Zooming You with the single "Dr. Feelgood" in 1994 that they broke through. It ended as number 21 on the most sold singles list that year and has retained popularity ever since.

James Dandu (Cool James), died in a car crash in his native country of Tanzania on August 27, 2002.

Discography

Singles

References 

Cool James and Black Teacher at Eurodance Encyclopædia

Swedish musical groups
Swedish Eurodance groups